Members of the committees and commission of the 8th National Assembly:

Committees

Committee on Agriculture, Forestry and Food (CAFF) 

Former members:

 Zdravko Počivalšek (SMC)

Committee on Culture (CC) 

Former members:

 Marko Bandelli (SAB)

Committee on Defence (CD) 

Former members:

 Zdravko Počivalšek (SMC)
 Rudi Medved (LMŠ)

Committee on Education, Science, Sport and Youth (CESSY) 

Former members:

 Marko Bandelli (SAB)

Committee on EU Affairs (CEU) 

Former members:

 Jernej Vrtovec (NSi)
 Felice Žiža (IMNS)
 Anže Logar (SDS)
 Dejan Kaloh (SDS)
 Robert Pavšič (LMŠ)
 Marko Koprivc (SD)
 Monika Gregorčič (SMC)
 Peter Jožef Česnik (SAB)
 Jurij Lep (DeSUS)
Zdravko Počivalšek (SMC)

Committee on Finance (CF)

Committee on Foreign Policy 

Former members:

 Žan Mahnič (SDS)
 Jože Lenart (LMŠ)
 Andreja Zabret (LMŠ)
 Samo Bevk (SD)
 Miro Cerar (SMC)

Committee on Health (CH) 

Former members:

 Miro Cerar (SMC)

Committee on Infrastructure, Environment and Spatial Planning (CIESP) 

Former members:

 Rudi Medved (LMŠ)

Committee on Justice (CJ) 

Former members:

 Miro Cerar (SMC)
 Peter Jožef Česnik (SAB)

Committee on Labour, Family, Social Policy and Disability (CLFSPD)

Committee on the Economy (CE)

Committee on the Interior, Public Administration and Local Self-Government (CIPALSG) 

Former members:

 Miro Cerar (SMC)
 Peter Jožef Česnik (SAB)
 Rudi Medved (LMŠ)

Joint Committee (JC) 

Former members:

 Marjan Šarec (LMŠ)

Standing commissions

Commission for Petitions, Human Rights and Equal Opportunities (CPHREO) 

Former members:

 Marko Bandelli (SAB)

Commission for Public Office and Elections 

Former members:

 Jelka Godec (SDS)
Marko Bandelli (SAB)
Franc Breznik (SDS)
Zvonko Černač (SDS)
Tina Heferle (LMŠ)
Rudi Medved (LMŠ)
Luka Mesec (Levica)
Peter Jožef Česnik (SAB)

Commission for Relations with Slovenes in Neighbouring and Other Countries (CRSNOC) 

Former members:

 Marko Bandelli (SAB)

Commission for the National Communities (CNC)

Commission for the Rules of Procedure (CRP) 

Former members:

 Rudi Medved (LMŠ)

Supervisory commissions

Commission for Public Finance Control (CPFC)

Commission for the Supervision of Intelligence and Security Services (CSISS)

Other bodies

Council of the Speaker 

Former members:

 Matej Tonin (NSi)
Marko Bandelli (SAB)

Slovenian politicians
National Assembly (Slovenia)
8th National Assembly (Slovenia)